Juan Leandro Quiroga (born 20 April 1982 in Córdoba) is a retired Argentine footballer.

Career
Quiroga started his playing career with Banfield in 2002. Between 2004 and 2007 he played in the Argentine 2nd Division with Defensa y Justicia. He had a short spell with Puebla F.C. in Mexico before joining Newell's in 2008. On 20 May 2010 the Newell's Old Boys 28-year-old left wingback joined on loan to Club Atlético Colón.

References

External links
 

1982 births
Living people
Footballers from Córdoba, Argentina
Argentine footballers
Argentine expatriate footballers
Argentine Primera División players
Club Atlético Banfield footballers
Club Puebla players
Defensa y Justicia footballers
Newell's Old Boys footballers
Club Atlético Colón footballers
Club Atlético Belgrano footballers
Club de Gimnasia y Esgrima La Plata footballers
Olimpo footballers
Argentine expatriate sportspeople in Mexico
Expatriate footballers in Mexico
Association football defenders